The 2021 Liga 3 Central Java (also known as Liga 3 MS Glow For Men PSSI Jawa Tengah for sponsorship reason) will be the sixth season of Liga 3 Central Java as a qualifying round for the national round of the 2021–22 Liga 3.

Persiku Kudus were the defending champion.

Teams
There are 26 teams participated in the league this season.

Venues
Group A: Mochtar Stadium, Pemalang
Group B: Hoegeng Stadium, Pekalongan
Group C: Kebondalem Stadium, Kendal
Group D: Moch. Soebroto Stadium, Magelang
Group E: Bhumi Phala Stadium, Temanggung

First round

Group A

Group B

Group C

Group D

Group E

Second round

Group F

Group G

Knockout stage

Semifinals

Third place

Finals

References

Liga 3
Sport in Central Java
Liga 3 (Indonesia) seasons